Enemy at the Gate(s) may refer to:

Art, entertainment, and media

Film
Enemy at the Gates (2001), a war film titled after William Craig's 1973 book

Literature
Enemy at the Gates: The Battle for Stalingrad (1973), William Craig's non-fiction book

Television
 "Enemy at the Gate" (Frasier), an episode of Frasier
 "Enemy at the Gate" (Stargate Atlantis), the final episode of Stargate Atlantis
 "Enemy at the Gates" (The Flash), an episode of The Flash
"Enemy at the Gates" (The Legend of Korra), An episode of The Legend of Korra

See also
 Enemy at the Door, a British television drama series